Indira Gandhi AS&E (formerly known as Jeppiaar Institute FC) is an Indian women's association football club based in Puducherry, that competes in the Indian Women's League.

History
Indira Gandhi AS&E was formed as Jeppiaar Institute F.C. in 2016 as a team of 12 under-privileged girls coached by Mariappan, a football coach, who coached the boys living in a government-run children's home in Cuddalore, Tamil Nadu. The girls, also living in the home, asked him to coach them when he reluctantly agreed, a few years prior to the club's formation.

Team records

Seasons

Honours
 Pondicherry Women's League
 Champions (1): 2020–21

References

External links
 Team profile at All India Football Federation

Football clubs in Puducherry
Association football clubs established in 2016
2016 establishments in Puducherry
Women's football clubs in India